Jan Petrovych (Yakov Pinevich, Yakiv Pinevych) Tabachnyk (born July 31, 1945, Chernivtsi) is a Soviet and Ukrainian variety composer, accordionist, politician and entrepreneur.

Biography
Tabachnyk was born on 31 July 1945 into a Jewish family.
He is a member of the Party of Regions, a deputy of the Verkhovna Rada (5th and 6th convocations). Tabachnyk was placed at number 18 on the electoral list of Party of Regions during the 2012 Ukrainian parliamentary election. He was re-elected into parliament. Tabachnyk has not taken part in elections since.

Awards
People's Artist of Ukraine (1994)
Order of Merit (III grade) (August 1999)
Order of Merit (II grade) (May 2002)
Order of Merit (I grade) (August 2004)

References

External links
 Довідник «Хто є хто в Україні», видавництво «К. І. С.»

Soviet composers
Soviet male composers
Ukrainian composers
Politicians from Chernivtsi
Living people
Party of Regions politicians
Fifth convocation members of the Verkhovna Rada
Sixth convocation members of the Verkhovna Rada
Seventh convocation members of the Verkhovna Rada
Jewish Ukrainian politicians
Ukrainian accordionists
Chevaliers of the Order of Merit (Ukraine)
1945 births
Jewish Ukrainian musicians
21st-century accordionists
Recipients of the title of People's Artists of Ukraine
20th-century male musicians
21st-century male musicians
Musicians from Chernivtsi